This was the first edition of the tournament.

Jordan Thompson won the title after defeating Yuki Bhambri 7–5, 3–6, 7–5 in the final.

Seeds

Draw

Finals

Top half

Bottom half

References
Main Draw
Qualifying Draw

Chennai Open Challenger - Singles